Sit on it may refer to:

 Sitting
 Slang for waiting or hoarding/holding onto something until the right time to sell it or let it go
 "Sit on it", derogatory catchphrase created by Bob Brunner and said by Fonzie on the 1970s-80s television show Happy Days (meaning ”piss off”)
 Sit on It!, 1975 jazz album by Jimmy Smith
 "Sit on It", song by Dead or Alive on their 1984 album Sophisticated Boom Boom
 Sit on It, 1987 single by Eugene Kelly with The Pastels
 "Sit on It", song by The Halo Benders on their 1994 album God Don't Make No Junk
 "Sit on It", Garfield and Friends 1994 episode